Partners of the Trail is a 1944 American Western film directed by Lambert Hillyer. This is the seventh film in the "Marshal Nevada Jack McKenzie" series, and stars Johnny Mack Brown as Jack McKenzie and Raymond Hatton as his sidekick Sandy Hopkins, with Craig Woods, Christine McIntyre and Marshall Reed.

Cast
Johnny Mack Brown as U.S. Marshal Nevada Jack McKenzie 
Raymond Hatton as U.S. Marshal Sandy Hopkins 
Craig Woods as Joel Dixon 
Christine McIntyre as Kate Hilton 
Marshall Reed as Clint Baker - Henchman 
Joseph Eggenton as J.D. Edwards 
Jack Ingram as Deputy Trigger 
Hal Price as Sheriff Dobbey 
Lynton Brent as Lem - Henchman 
Lloyd Ingraham as Doc Applegate 
Ben Corbett as Duke - Henchman 
Ted Mapes as Slinkky - Henchman 
Steve Clark as Colby - Rancher

References

Bibliography
Martin, Len D. The Allied Artists Checklist: The Feature Films and Short Subjects of Allied Artists Pictures Corporation, 1947-1978. McFarland & Company, 1993.

External links

1944 films
1944 Western (genre) films
American black-and-white films
American Western (genre) films
Films directed by Lambert Hillyer
Monogram Pictures films
1940s English-language films
1940s American films